Pima High School is a high school in Pima, Arizona. It is operated by the Pima Unified School District, which also operates an elementary school and junior high school.

Athletics
Football – State Champions: 2015

External links

Public high schools in Arizona
Schools in Graham County, Arizona